"The Divine Image" is a poem by the English poet William Blake from his book Songs of Innocence (1789), not to be confused with "A Divine Image" from Songs of Experience (1794). It was later included in his joint collection Songs of Innocence and of Experience (1794). In this poem (see Wikisource below) Blake pictures his view of an ideal world in which the four traditionally Christian virtues–Mercy, Pity, Peace and Love–are found in the human's heart and stand for God's support and comfort. Joy and gratitude are sentiments expressed through prayer for the caring and blessing of an infallible almighty God and are shared by all men on Earth encompassing a sense of equality and mutual respect. The title of the poem refers to the Book of Genesis Chapter 1 verse 26: 'And God said: Let us make man in our image'.(KJV)

Ralph Vaughan Williams set the poem to music in his 1958 song cycle Ten Blake Songs.

Summary
In The Divine Image, the figures of Mercy, Pity, Peace and Love are presented by Blake as the four virtues which are objects of prayer in moments of distress, God being praised for his lovely caring and blessing to comfort man. The four virtues are depicted by the author as essential not only in God, but also in man; as Mercy is found in the human heart and Pity in the human face. Similarly, abstract qualities like Peace and Love exist in the human form, becoming the divine form and body of man and resembling God's substantial virtues. Consequently, Blake not only introduces a similarity between the divine image of a benevolent God and the human form but also the concept of the creation of man after God's divine constituency. Regarded as inborn characteristics of humans by Blake, these essentially Christian virtues can be found in every man's soul on Earth, notwithstanding his origin or religious belief. However, his Song of Experience balances the ideals of pluralism with the image of God in humans marred by sin.

External links

A comparison of extant original copies of "The Divine Image" at the William Blake Archive

1789 poems
Songs of Innocence and of Experience